Andriy Valertiyovych Zhurzhiy (born March 19, 1978) - is a Ukrainian politician and lawyer, former members of Parliament of the 8th convocation as a member of the parliamentary faction Samopomich Union. In July 2018 Zhurzhiy revoked his parliamentary seat, claiming his colleagues were responsible for the "rollback and suspension of reforms ahead of the parliamentary elections", but parliament refused to release him from parliament. Zhurzhiy did not return to parliament following the 2019 Ukrainian parliamentary election.

Biography 
Zhurzhiy was born in the town of Uman, Cherkasy Oblast.

In 2004 he graduated from the Odessa Academy of Law.

From 2005 and until 2014 Zhurzhiy worked as the Director of the Law Department at Fozzy Group. Additionally, he was the president of Investment Partners Group. Zhurzhiy's Law Department in the Fozzy Group has been recognised as the best in FMCG by the newspaper Legal Practice in 2008, 2009, 2010, 2013. In 2008 and 2013 was named the best corporate lawyer by the newspaper Legal Practice. The same newspaper has named Zhurzhiy one of the three best lawyer in taxation. In 2013 Russian journal Corporate Lawyer has named the Law Department of Fozzy Group the best among trade companies law departments in CIS.

Andriy Zhurzhiy is a member of Assembly of Lawyers of Ukraine, member of the Civic Council at the Antimonopoly Committee of Ukraine, the Chair of the Ukrainian Association of Investing Business, co-founder of the Association of Taxation Counsellors.

Zhurzhiy is married and has three children.

References 

1978 births
Living people
People from Uman
Odesa Law Academy alumni
Ukrainian jurists
Eighth convocation members of the Verkhovna Rada
Self Reliance (political party) politicians